The Calgary Bronks were a senior ice hockey team from Calgary, Alberta. They were organized in 1928 in the Southern Alberta Senior League. It moved to the Alberta Senior League in the merger of 1936.

The Bronks won the Southern League title in 1929-30, 1931–32, and 1932-33. They won the Alberta title in 1931-32 but lost the Western Canada final.

They merged with the Calgary Rangers in 1938 to form the Calgary Stampeders hockey team.

Season-by-season records

Southern Alberta Senior Hockey League
 Season	Games	Won	Lost	Tied	Points	GoalsFor	GoalsAgainst	Standing	Playoffs	
 1928–29	18	9	7	2	20	42	41	1st	Lost Final	
 1929–30	16	9	6	1	19	34	28	1st	Won Final Lost Provincial Semi Final	
 1930–31	16	6	7	3	15	28	29	4th	Lost Semi Final	
 1931–32	20	17	2	1	35	-	-	1st	Won Final Lost West Final	
 1932–33	8	6	1	1	13	28	16	1st	Won Final Lost Provincial Final	
 1933–34	16	5	10	1	11	54	69	3rd	out of playoffs	
 1934–35	18	9	6	3	21	79	58	2nd	Lost Semi Final	
 1935–36	22	9	12	1	19	96	99	2nd	Lost Final

Alberta Senior Hockey League
 Season	Games	Won	Lost	Tied	Points	GoalsFor	GoalsAgainst	Standing	Playoffs	
 1936–37	26	15	10	1	31	123	88	2nd	Lost Semi Final	
 1937–38	26	4	22	0	8	85	158	6th	out of playoffs

References

Alberta Senior Hockey League
Defunct ice hockey teams in Canada
Bro
Ice hockey teams in Alberta
Senior ice hockey teams
Ice hockey clubs established in 1928
1928 establishments in Alberta
1938 disestablishments in Alberta